Suqubiya is a village in Al Madinah Province, in western Saudi Arabia.

See also 

 List of cities and towns in Saudi Arabia

References

Populated places in Medina Province (Saudi Arabia)